Hospital Pedro de Elizalde is a hospital in Buenos Aires, Argentina.

References

Hospitals in Buenos Aires
Hospitals established in the 1770s